Minosuke Hiroe (7 June 1914 – 12 January 2000) was a Japanese botanist. His main works are on the Umbelliferae, from which family he described many new species. His work has been criticized by Lincoln Constance.

Books 
 M. Hiroe, 1990. Kyoto matsuri to hana. Ed. Seiseisha; Shohan ed. 207 pp. 
 M. Hiroe, 1980. Sōsa shokubutsugaku/Criminal investigation botany section. Ed. Ariake Shoten, Shōwa
 M. Hiroe, 1979. Umbelliferae of World. Ed. Ariake Book Co. 2128 pp. 
 M. Hiroe, 1971. Orchid Flowers. Two vols. (English, Latín, Japanese) Ed. Kyoto:Kyoto-Shoin Co
 M. Hiroe, 1958. Umbelliferae of Asia: (excluding Japan). Ed. Eikodo
 M. Hiroe, Lincoln Constance|Constance, L. Umbelliferae of Japan. University of California Publications in Botany 30 (1.)

References

External links 

 

20th-century Japanese botanists
1914 births
2000 deaths